Constant Martin (1910–1995) was a French engineer and inventor who perfected and successfully commercialised radio sets and most famously the Clavioline, a precursor to the synthesizer. He was the grandfather of director Michel Gondry and Oliver "Twist" Gondry.

After having obtained diplomas in 1930 as an electrical engineer and radio technician, Martin began his career working for Victor Martin (no  relation), a manufacturer of radios, where he developed an original receiver.  In 1932 in  Versailles, he began to experiment with the creation of electronic music. During 1932 to 1937 he developed an instrument related to the organ which used harmonium reeds. The instrument was demonstrated in the Church of St Odile in Paris in July 1939.

In 1943, he completed the construction of an electronic organ with independent oscillators and harmonic analyzers, which he presented at the  Louvre Oratory in Saint-Louis des Invalides and at the Palace of Chaillot. He also made the electronic bells that rang out at the city hall to sound the liberation of the city of Versailles. The Clavioline was launched in 1947 with great commercial success. It was manufactured by Selmer in  France and the United Kingdom, by Gibson in the USA, and by Jorgensen in Germany.  It rapidly became the world's leading monophonic instrument with more than 30,000 sold in the UK alone.

In the 1950s, using the most recent electronic discoveries to improve his organs and bells, Martin demonstrated new electronic bells at the Church  of Saint-Philippe-du-Roule in Paris. In 1961, using transistors, he was able to add harmonic effects to his instruments to produce sounds that  almost faithfully reproduced the sound of a pipe organ. From the early 1960s his electronic sounds could be heard introducing the time on Radio Europe No. 1, and the announcements at Orly Airport. His Clavioline would be used by famous artists of the day such as The Beatles, Del Shannon, and The Tornados.

Martin was unable to compete when polyphonic synthesizers from Italy, Austria, and the Netherlands were introduced. Nevertheless, for over thirty  years, Martin had pioneered and revolutionised the manufacture of electronic instruments and demonstrated the possibility of producing a variety of sounds that could be used in many genres of music.

Bibliography

20th-century French inventors
1910 births
1995 deaths